Tinuy-an Falls is a multi-tiered waterfall in Bislig, Surigao del Sur in the southern island of Mindanao, Philippines. Bislig is a city known as the Booming City by the Bay. The waterfall itself has been featured in various international travel magazines and TV shows.

Tinuy-an is a white water curtain that flows in three levels (with a fourth tier hidden from view) and is said to be the widest waterfall in the Philippines. Every morning, the area shows a rainbow between 9 a.m. to 11 a.m. One may also ride a raft to get close to its cascades and get a water “massage.”

Tinuy-an Falls is a co-management effort between the tourism office of Bislig and the Manobo Tribal Council.

Etymology

The name Tinuy-an comes from the word Tinuyo-an, a native Cebuano vernacular which means "intentional act or performance to attain an objective or goal". It can also be transliterated into the Filipino context as Babalik-balikan ("a place you’ll keep going back to").

Legendary allusions
Legends says that long time ago, the people living on the Magdiwata Mountain were turned into slaves by tribesmen from Agusan. These tribesmen were so cruel and did not treat the slaves humanely, forcing them to do very difficult tasks. Eventually, the slaves felt tired of their abusive masters, they planned on attaining their freedom. While they were rowing the gakit (bamboo raft), the slaves jumped into the water and forcefully pushed the gakit towards the waterfalls, consequently killing their masters, and ultimately attaining their freedom. This action of the slaves were planned, or intended, hence, the name of the waterfalls.

Geography 

Tinuy-an Falls is located in Barangay Burboanan, a one-hour ride from Barangay Mangagoy, centre of trade and commerce in Bislig, via the Poblacion-San Isidro (Bagnan) route.

See also
 Bislig
 Surigao del Sur
 List of waterfalls in Mindanao

References

External links
 Tinuy-an Falls Website
 Tinuy-an Falls Travel Guide
 

Waterfalls of the Philippines
Bislig
Landforms of Surigao del Sur
Tourist attractions in Surigao del Sur